Thalattu is a 1993 Indian Tamil-language film directed by T. K. Rajendran and produced by P. Mohanraj. The film stars Arvind Swamy, Sukanya and Sivaranjini, while Goundamani, Senthil, Vijayakumar and Kovai Sarala play other supporting roles.

Cast
Arvind Swamy as Kuzhanthai
Sukanya as Dr. Revathi
Sivaranjini
Goundamani
Vijayakumar
Kovai Sarala
Mansoor Ali Khan
Poornam Viswanathan
Vinu Chakravarthy
Kanthimathi
Senthil

Soundtrack
The music was composed by Ilaiyaraaja and the lyrics were by Pulamaipiththan.

Reception
The Indian Express wrote "Thalattu is fairly watchable though it takes its own time to tell the story. [..] It is slow-paced but soothing melody".

References

1993 films
Indian drama films
Films scored by Ilaiyaraaja
1990s Tamil-language films
1993 drama films